Nicholas Edward True, Baron True  (born 31 July 1951) is a British Conservative politician serving as Leader of the House of Lords and Lord Keeper of the Privy Seal since September 2022.

Early life and education
True was born on 31 July 1951 to Edward Thomas True and Kathleen Louise True (née Mather). He was educated at Nottingham High School and Peterhouse, Cambridge, from which he graduated with a Bachelor of Arts (BA) degree in 1973; as per tradition, his BA was promoted to a Master of Arts (MA Cantab) in 1978.

Politics
True worked in the Conservative Research Department from 1975 to 1982, also serving as assistant to the Deputy Leader of the Conservative Party from 1978 to 1982. He was special adviser to Norman Fowler, Secretary of State for Health and Social Security from 1982 to 1986. He then moved to be Director of the Public Policy Unit from 1986 to 1990. He was Deputy Head of the Prime Minister's Policy Unit from 1991 to 1995, before becoming special adviser within the Prime Minister's Office in 1997, until the general election of that year. In his memoirs the former Prime Minister John Major says that True was his favourite speechwriter. He was appointed a Commander of the Order of the British Empire (CBE) in the 1993 New Year Honours.

True served as private secretary to the Leader of the Opposition in the House of Lords and Director of the Opposition Whips' Office there from 1997 to 2010. On 23 December 2010 he was created a life peer as Baron True, of East Sheen in the County of Surrey.

In June 2021, he announced plans for the Platinum Jubilee Civic Honours in the House of Lords.

Public office
He was a Conservative councillor in the London Borough of Richmond-upon-Thames from 1986 to 1990 and again from 1998 to 2018. He served as Leader of the Council from 2010 to 2017, having previously served as Deputy Leader from 2002 to 2006 and Leader of the Opposition from 2006 to 2010.

He has been, since 2006, a trustee of the Richmond Civic Trust, and since 1996 a trustee of Sir Harold Hood's Charitable Trust. He served the Olga Havel Foundation in the same capacity from 1990 to 1994.

In February 2020 True was made a Minister of State at the Cabinet Office.

On 6 September 2022, Liz Truss promoted him to Cabinet and appointed him Leader of the House of Lords.

On 13 September 2022, he was sworn-in as a Member of the Privy Council of the United Kingdom.

Personal life
In 1979 he married Anne-Marie Elena Kathleen Blanco, daughter of Robin Adrian Hood, director of CAFOD from 1977 to 1982, and granddaughter of the businessman and Conservative politician Sir Joseph Hood, 1st Baronet. They have two sons and one daughter.

Notes

References

Who's Who 2011

|-

|-

|-

|-

Living people
1951 births
People educated at Nottingham High School
Alumni of Peterhouse, Cambridge
Commanders of the Order of the British Empire
Conservative Party (UK) councillors
Conservative Party (UK) life peers
Leaders of the House of Lords
Lords Privy Seal
Councillors in the London Borough of Richmond upon Thames
Leaders of local authorities of England
Life peers created by Elizabeth II
Members of the Privy Council of the United Kingdom